Ente Sneham Ninakku Mathram is a 1979 Indian Malayalam film,  directed by P. Sadhananthan. The film stars Sharada, Jagathy Sreekumar, Jose and Sukumaran in the lead roles. The film has musical score by Shyam.

Cast
Sukumaran
Jose
Sharada
Jagathy Sreekumar
Sadhana
Suchitra
Sankaradi
Janardhanan
Murali Mohan (Malayalam Actor)

Soundtrack
The music was composed by Shyam and the lyrics were written by Bichu Thirumala.

References

External links
 

1979 films
1970s Malayalam-language films